Gela Inalishvili (born 3 October 1966) is a Soviet and Georgian former footballer who played as a midfielder.

International career
Inalishvili made his Georgia debut on 11 June 1994, a friendly match. He played two more friendly and six time in UEFA Euro 1996 qualifying. His last cap was 1998 FIFA World Cup qualification (UEFA) against Italy.

References

External links

Living people
1966 births
Association football midfielders
Soviet footballers
Footballers from Georgia (country)
Georgia (country) international footballers
FC Dinamo Sukhumi players
FC Dinamo Tbilisi players
PFC Krylia Sovetov Samara players
Russian Premier League players
Expatriate footballers from Georgia (country)
Expatriate sportspeople from Georgia (country) in Russia
Expatriate footballers in Russia